Barakat Mubarak Al-Harthi (born 15 June 1988) is an Omani sprinter who specializes in the 100 metres.

Biography

He was born in Ibra. He competed at the 2009, 2013 and 2015 World Championships and the 2010 and 2014 World Indoor Championships without reaching the final.

Al-Harthi won a bronze medal at the Asian Games in Guangzhou, China in the 100m, which was Oman's only medal in the Games.

His personal best times are 6.67 seconds in the 60 metres, achieved at the 2010 World Indoor Championships in Doha; 9.97 seconds in the 100 metres, achieved in June 2016 in Stara Zagora; and 20.77 seconds in the 200 metres, achieved 2011 in Manama.

He ran at the 2011 Pan Arab Games but his sample came back positive for banned substances and he was banned for six months. After his ban, Al-Harthi 
competed at the 2012 Summer Olympics in the 100 metres.

Al-Harthi qualified for the 2016 Summer Olympics with a time of 10.16 seconds at the 2015 Military World Games. In 2016, his Olympic qualifying time of 10.05 seconds was 0.11 seconds faster than the required time to enter the men's 100 metres. While flying to Rio to compete at the 2016 Summer Olympics, Al-Harthi missed his layover and lost some of his sports equipment. On 13 August, Al-Harthi did not appear in the preliminary round and competed in the sixth race of the heats. Al-Harthi finished in third in his heat with a time of 10.22 seconds. His placing meant Al-Harthi did not qualify as one of the first two runners in his individual heat, and as he also did not have one of the eight fastest times from the remaining runners, Al-Harthi did not progress to the semi-finals. Out of 84 competitors, Al-Harthi finished in a tie for 26th place overall.

References

External links
 
 
 

1988 births
Living people
Omani male sprinters
Doping cases in athletics
Asian Games bronze medalists for Oman
Asian Games medalists in athletics (track and field)
Athletes (track and field) at the 2012 Summer Olympics
Athletes (track and field) at the 2016 Summer Olympics
Athletes (track and field) at the 2020 Summer Olympics
Olympic male sprinters
Olympic athletes of Oman
Athletes (track and field) at the 2010 Asian Games
Athletes (track and field) at the 2014 Asian Games
Athletes (track and field) at the 2018 Asian Games
World Athletics Championships athletes for Oman
Omani sportspeople in doping cases
Medalists at the 2010 Asian Games
People from Ash Sharqiyah North Governorate